FC Mokpo is a South Korean association football club based in Mokpo, South Jeolla. Since the 2010 season, Mokpo have played in the K3 League, the third tier of Korean football.

Honours

Domestic competitions

Cups
 National Sports Festival
  Bronze Medal (1): 2011

Current squad
As of 2 July 2022

Statistics

References

External links 
 Official website
 Facebook

Korea National League clubs
K3 League clubs
Sport in South Jeolla Province
Mokpo
Association football clubs established in 2009
2009 establishments in South Korea